Aquamagicaa Waterpark, formerly known as Amaazia Water Park, is an amusement water park in Surat, Gujarat, India. Aquamagicaa opened to the public on 15 December 2016, inaugurated by the then Chief Minister of Gujarat, Vijay Rupani. It is built by the Rajgreen Group of Companies. But in February 2023, Rajgreen Group of Companies sold the waterpark to Imagica World Entertainment Ltd.

Rides and pools

There are three types of rides available "Thrill", "Fun" and "Kids".

Thrill 
 King Kobra
 Twister
 Forest Jump
 Kamikaze

Fun 
 Tribal Twist
 Windigo
 Wild Raft
 Jungle Boat
 Free Fall
 Black Hole
 The Carnival Beach
 Sky Slider

Kids 
 Pond of Life

Services 
 Free parking for two wheelers and four wheelers
 ATM 
 Shopping
 Lost and Found items
 Wheel chair
 Cloak Room
 Disabled visitors
 Restaurant
 Charge your cell phone
 First aid
 Lockers

References

External links

Article on Amaazia in The_Economic_Times
Article on Amaazia in The_Economic_Times 
Article on Amaazia in The Financial Express (India)
Article on Amaazia in Business Standard, India
Article on Amaazia in Indiatoday

Tourist attractions in Surat
Water parks in India
2016 establishments in Gujarat
Amusement parks opened in 2016